Gjorgi Markovski (Macedonian: Ѓорги Марковски, born January 8, 1986) is an alpine skier who competed for Macedonia at the 2006 Winter Olympics. He was selected as his nation's flag bearer at the opening ceremony.

References 

1986 births
Living people
Macedonian male alpine skiers
Olympic alpine skiers of North Macedonia
Alpine skiers at the 2006 Winter Olympics